The Republican Party or Republican Right —also known as Republican Democratic Right— was a Chilean centre-right political party existing from 1982 to 1987 during the military dictatorship of Augusto Pinochet.

Its origins date back to late October 1982, when a group of politicians from the National Party founded the Center for Analysis of National and International Reality. His goal was to provide a basis for the formation of a right-wing democratic party, inspired by modern liberalism and respectful of human rights. This would give rise to a party whose name would be Republican Right, led by the ex-conservative Julio Subercaseaux and ex-liberals Hugo Zepeda Barrios and Armando Jaramillo Lyon.

The party was among the founding members of the Democratic Alliance on August 6, 1983, having previously signed the Democratic Manifesto of March 14 of that year. In October 1984, it changed its name to the Republican Party after entry of the Liberal Party to the coalition. Both merged in 1987 to form the Liberal-Republican Union.

References

Liberal parties in Chile
Political parties established in 1982
Political parties disestablished in 1987
Defunct political parties in Chile
1982 establishments in Chile
1987 disestablishments in Chile